Pierre de L'Estoile (1546 – 8 October 1611) was a French diarist and collector.

Life
Born in Paris into a middle-class background, Pierre de l'Estoile was tutored by Mathieu Béroalde. He knew Agrippa d'Aubigné. He became a law student at Bourges (1565). He became a notary, and royal secretary.

He spent time in prison in 1589, being taken for one of the supporters of the politiques. He died in Paris in 1611.

Works 

The manuscript diaries of Pierre de L'Estoile (1546–1611) were deposited in the library of the Abbey of Saint-Acheul by his descendant Pierre Poussemthe de L'Estoile when he died in 1718. 
Pierre Poussemthe de L'Estoile was the abbot of Saint Acheul.
The bookseller Pierre Mongie took possession of L'Estoile's manuscripts after the abbey was dissolved, and they were later acquired by the Royal library.
The diaries were used as sources for various historical works on the period of Henry III and Henry IV of France.

The Registres Journaux (1574-1611) are personal accounts of the reigns of Henry III and Henry IV of France. They contain other matter (sonnets, pamphlets).
The Journals were not intended for publication. Material from them was edited as Journal de Henri III (1621 by Louis Servin, 1744 by Nicolas Lenglet Du Fresnoy); and the  Journal de Henri IV (The Hague, 1741).

Bibliography 
 Registre-Journal du règne de Henri III, éd. M. Lazard et G. Schrenck, Genève, Droz, 1992
 M. Chopard, "En marge de la grande érudition, un amateur éclairé, Pierre de L'Estoile", Histoire et Littérature. Les écrivains et la politique, Paris, P.U.F., 1977
G. Schrenck, "L'image du prince dans le Journal du règne de Henri III de P. de L'Estoile, ou l'enjeu d'une écriture", L'image du souverain dans les Lettres françaises, 1985, p. 15-25.
 F. Marin, "La fortune éditoriale des Registres journaux des règnes de Henri III et Henri IV de Pierre de L'Estoile", Nouvelle Revue du XVIe siècle, 20/2 - 2002, p. 87-108.

See also 
 Minuscule 9
 Minuscule 284

Notes

Citations

Sources

External links

 

1546 births
1611 deaths
Writers from Paris
French diarists
16th-century French writers
16th-century male writers
17th-century French writers
17th-century French male writers
16th-century French lawyers
17th-century French lawyers
16th-century memoirists
16th-century diarists
17th-century diarists